The European Legacy is a peer-reviewed academic journal covering the study of European intellectual and cultural history. It was established in 1996 and is published seven times per year by Taylor & Francis. The editors-in-chief are Ezra Talmor, David W. Lovell, and Edna Rosenthal.

References

External links
 

Multidisciplinary humanities journals
Multidisciplinary social science journals
Multilingual journals
Publications established in 1996
Taylor & Francis academic journals
7 times per year journals